Histidine ammonia-lyase (EC 4.3.1.3, histidase, histidinase) is an enzyme that in humans is encoded by the HAL gene. It converts histidine into ammonia and urocanic acid. Its systematic name is L-histidine ammonia-lyase (urocanate-forming).

Function 

Histidine ammonia-lyase is a cytosolic enzyme catalyzing the first reaction in histidine catabolism, the nonoxidative deamination of L-histidine to trans-urocanic acid. The reaction is catalyzed by 3,5-dihydro-5-methyldiene-4H-imidazol-4-one, an electrophilic co-factor which is formed autocatalytically by cyclization of the protein backbone of the enzyme.

Pathology 
Mutations in the gene for histidase are associated with histidinemia and urocanic aciduria.

References

Further reading

External links 
 

EC 4.3.1